Jwibulnori is a Korean game in which participants create streaks of light by swinging cans filled with burning items. The game is played during the first full moon of the year in the lunar calendar, which is a national holiday in Korea. It is played during the time when fires are started on farmlands to exterminate harmful insects and rats by burning away their habitat. Another purpose of the game is to wish for good health.

People make a torchlight with a basket or container tied with a strong string. The game is often played by twirling the string. There can also be fights between other village members. They play the game until midnight and, after enjoying the game, the fire is set on the farmland.

Meaning 
Jwibulnori is practiced as a folk game in urbanized settings. The game creates a sense of community and burns dead grass, pests and germs, thus, aiding a fruitful harvest. The game welcomes the New Year by purifying old misfortune to obtain good fortune.

Origin 
Jwibulnori originated from the custom of burning the ridge between rice paddies by setting dry grass from the paddy fields on fire the day before New Year's Day.

Modern Jwibulnori 
Although Jwibulnori is less often practiced, it is still part of many New Year's Eve festivities. Children use long rings made of wire in cans by drilling holes in the bottom and sides of cans. Jwibulnori is typically held at a place where a sheaf burning event is held, in a wide field or a field with a low risk of spreading a fire.

Fire-can game is an activity that has been performed with Jwibulnori. According to the testimonies of the elderly, it originated from the widespread use of cans after the Korean War. In other words, it was naturally combined with Jwibulnori while various kinds of canned food among the military materials that were airlifted during the war were used as amusement tools. When the can is swirling and midnight is near, all the wood in the fire-can is burned, leaving only embers. At that point, the can is tossed into the air, letting the embers fall out and glitter the sky. This is seen as a way to send out bad luck and welcome good luck, as is flying a kite on New Year's day.

Preparation 
To make a fire-can, dozens of holes are drilled in the surface of an empty can. This creates airflow that feeds the fire. A meter of wire is connected to each side to make a handle. 

Typical play is to burn brooms or trees and the fields around the village. Depending on the province, people use kindling made of mugwort or Bulkkangtong (Hangul: 불깡통, meaning: fire-cans).

Gameplay 

Sticks are placed in the can, and the fire is lit. The wire is then held with one hand and swirled vigorously so that the fuel in the can burns. Children spin cans and compete over whose fire burns better. The use of fire cans has been replacing the use of torches or a straw bundles; thus playing the fire-can can be understood as a type of Jwibulnori.

Jwibulnori in Jeju 
In Jeju Island, people set a fire in the rangeland of Mt. Halla (Hangul: 한라산) during the month of February, or Hwaip (Hangul: 화입). The area calls rats "daughter-in-law" because if you call a mouse a "mouse", it will understand and be trouble. Another custom warns against displaying a divination sign on the day of the mouse, and another avoids starching clothes. As Jwibulnori is related to rats, it is the same as burning a field on the first day of the first lunar month. Depending on the region, it is also known as "Jwibul" (Hangul: 쥐불) in conjunction with the moon torchlight on New Year’s Eve. To prevent fire, Jwibulnori is not allowed. Disease and pests are exterminated using pesticide instead of fire, so Jwibulnori is gradually disappearing.

Jwibulnori in China 
Bulnori (Hangul: 불놀이, mean: Displaying fireworks) on the 15th day of the New Year is derived from the idea of Sunghwa (Hangul: 숭화, Hanja: 崇火) which reveres fire. In southern China and Europe as well as Korea, farmers practice of burning fields is associated with their products. In China, a hunchung (Hangul: 훈충, Hanja: 燻蟲) event called Yongdaedu (Hangul: 용대두, Hanja: 龍擡頭) takes place on February 2. On this holiday a dragon raises his head. It is said that it is possible to prevent various insect disasters if it goes out of the kitchen door, spraying the ashes like a dragon.

Pyeongchang commemorative coins 
Pyeongchang commemorative coins are engraved with Jwibulnori. The currency issued to commemorate the PyeongChang Olympic Games is divided into commemorative bills and commemorative coins. Jwibulnori are engraved on gold coins. The gold coins are also engraved with traditional play paintings such as mono maple sled.

References

External links 

 Korea Cultural Heritage Foundation(한국문화재재단)
 Culturecontent(문화콘텐츠닷컴)

Korean games
Night in culture
Twirling
Traditional games
Fire in culture